Kadamai Kanniyam Kattupaadu is a 1987 Indian Tamil-language crime thriller film directed by Santhana Bharathi and produced by Kamal Haasan, starring Sathyaraj, Geetha and Captain Raju. The film had no songs, though the score was composed by Ilaiyaraaja. It is a remake of 1986 Malayalam film Aavanazhi. The film was released on 12 June 1987.

Plot 

The film revolves around the story of an honest and straightforward Tamil Nadu police officer and his life.

Cast 

Sathyaraj as SI Balaram
Geetha
Jeevitha
Captain Raju
Nassar as Reporter
Delhi Ganesh
Kamala Kamesh
Nalini
V. K. Ramasamy
Malaysia Vasudevan
Major Sundararajan
G. M. Sundar
S Sathyendra
T. K. S. Natarajan
Sivachandran
Kamal Haasan as himself (guest appearance)

Production 
Kadamai Kanniyam Kattupaadu is a remake of the 1986 Malayalam film Aavanazhi. Kamal Haasan produced the film, and although an established actor, did not star. Haasan initially planned to remake the Malayalam film Boeing Boeing (1985) in Tamil; however he dropped the plan and instead choose to remake Aavanazhi. Sathyaraj said he accepted to act in the film because it was a remake of a successful film, and was guaranteed to do well.

Release and reception 
Kadamai Kanniyam Kattupadu was released on 12 June 1987. Kalki said Sathyaraj was ruling every frame of the film.

See also 
 List of Indian films without songs

References

External links 
 

1980s crime thriller films
1980s Tamil-language films
1987 films
Fictional portrayals of the Tamil Nadu Police
Films directed by Santhana Bharathi
Films scored by Ilaiyaraaja
Films set in Tamil Nadu
Indian crime thriller films
Tamil remakes of Malayalam films